Shina may refer to:

 Shina language, an Indo-Aryan language spoken in Gilgit-Baltistan, Pakistan
 Shina people, a  Dardic ethnic group in Gilgit Baltistan, Pakistan

People named Shina

 Shina Matsudo (born 1973), Japanese freestyle swimmer
 Shina Peters (born 1958), Nigerian Jùjú musician
Shina Pellar (born 1976), Nigerian entrepreneur 
 Shina Rambo (born 1960s), Nigerian bandit
 Takeshi Shina (born 1966), Japanese politician
 Yakir Shina (born 1985), Israeli footballer

Others

 Shina (word), a largely archaic Japanese term for China
 Shina (Bloody Roar), Shina Gado, a character from the Bloody Roar video game series
 Shina, Kabul, Afghanistan
 S'hina, or Cholent,  traditional Jewish stew
 Shina wood, a kind of plywood commonly used in printing

See also

 
 Shiina, a Japanese surname
 Shin (disambiguation)
 Sina (disambiguation)

Language and nationality disambiguation pages
Japanese-language surnames
Japanese feminine given names